The International Brotherhood of Boilermakers, Iron Ship Builders, Blacksmiths, Forgers and Helpers (IBB) is a trade union in the United States and Canada. It is for boilermakers and related occupations, and is affiliated with both the AFL–CIO and CLC.

The Boilermakers union has a four-year apprenticeship training program before becoming a Journeyman. Boilermakers primarily work in nuclear and fossil power plants. However they also work in shipyards, refineries and chemical plants. The work involves welding, rigging and fabricating. All work done is governed by OSHA (Occupational Safety and Health Administration) or MSHA (Mine Safety and Health Administration).

History

Formation 
The International Brotherhood of Boilermakers, Iron Ship Builders, Blacksmiths, Forgers and Helpers was founded on September 1, 1893. On that day, at a meeting in Chicago, Illinois, representatives from the International Brotherhood of Boiler Makers and Iron Ship Builders, which had been organized on October 1, 1880, and the National Brotherhood of Boiler Makers, which had been formed in Atlanta, Georgia, in May 1888, resolved to consolidate their organizations. It was further agreed that the new organization, to be known as the Brotherhood of Boiler Makers and Iron Ship Builders of America, would make its headquarters in Kansas City, Kansas.

Affiliation with AFL 
Two and a half years later, on the ninth of June 1896, the Brotherhood affiliated with the American Federation of Labor.

Helpers Division 
In subsequent years, the Brotherhood continued to grow, and in 1902, the Helpers division was formed. Because helpers were barred from sitting in the lodge room with mechanics, this new division had its own local unions and was entirely separate from the Boiler Makers. This would change a decade later when the Helpers Division would be consolidated with the Mechanics Division.

Name change 
In March 1906, at a special Convention in Kansas City, the name of the Union was changed to the International Brotherhood of Boilermakers, Iron Ship Builders and Helpers of America in order to incorporate the newest division. Also at this time, the term "Boiler Makers" was condensed into one word, "Boilermakers."

Affiliation with AFL–CIO 
The Boilermakers affiliated with the Building Trades Department of the American Federation of Labor in February 1931. At the turn of the century, total membership stood at about 8,500, but by 1944, due in part to dramatic increases in the shipbuilding, railroad, and fabrication shop industries during World War II, the Boilermakers numbered over 350,000.

First merger 
In 1954, the Boilermakers merged their organization with the International Brotherhood of Blacksmiths, Drop Forgers and Helpers. The International Brotherhood of Blacksmiths had been organized in 1889 and added Helpers to both their membership and their name in 1901.

Second merger and name change 
A 1919 merger with the Brotherhood of Drop Forgers created the union that, on June 29, 1953, merged with the Boilermakers to create the International Brotherhood of Boilermakers, Iron Ship Builders, Blacksmiths, Forgers and Helpers. A year later, a new International seal was adopted to include all crafts.

Health and Welfare Fund 
On October 1, 1954, the Boilermaker National Health and Welfare Fund was established, on November 9, 1959, the Boilermakers National Joint Apprenticeship Fund began, and the Boilermaker-Blacksmith National Pension Trust became effective October 1, 1960.

Construction Division 
Delegates to the 1977 convention voted to establish a Construction Division at International Headquarters for the purpose of servicing those members with employment in, or related to, the construction industry.

Third merger 
On March 15, 1984, the delegates to the Special Merger Convention of the United Cement, Lime, Gypsum and Allied Workers International Union voted to merge with the International Brotherhood of Boilermakers, Iron Ship Builders, Blacksmiths, Forgers and Helpers. The merger of the CLGAW, formed in 1936, and its 10,000 members who dominate the building products and supplies industry, and the Boilermakers forged an organization with a greater ability to provide services to its members.

Fourth merger 
On October 1, 1994, a merger was consummated with the Stove, Furnace and Allied Appliance Workers' International Union—a skilled trade union that was organized in 1891. The Stove Workers, with 5,800 members, became a division of the International Brotherhood known as the Stove, Furnace, Energy and Allied Appliance Workers Division. The word energy was inserted to give special recognition to coal miners within that division. The division had its members employed primarily in the manufacturing of stoves and various types of appliances.

Fifth merger 
During the same period, merger talks were also being carried out with an independent union known as the Western Energy Workers. This one-local union, formed in 1978 with members employed in the coal strip-mining, signed a merger agreement with the Boilermakers effective December 1, 1994.

Sixth merger 
In October 1996, a merger agreement was made with the Metal Polishers', Buffers', Platers' and Allied Workers' International Union. This union was also an old line, skilled trade union that was organized in 1892. This merger brought 4,000 new members to the Brotherhood. These members are employed primarily in plating and polishing shops within the United States and Canada.

International president 
On July 24, 2003, International President Charles W. Jones resigned his office, and the International Executive Council elected Newton B. Jones to complete his unexpired term.

Newton B. Jones is a 44-year member of the Boilermakers union. After being elected to fill the unexpired term of International President Charles W. Jones, who retired after 20 years in office and 60 years of service to the Brotherhood, Newton Jones was unanimously reelected to the Boilermakers’ top leadership position in 2006 and 2011, during the union's 31st and 32nd Consolidated Conventions. In 2016, at the 33rd Consolidated Convention, he was reelected International President by an overwhelming margin.

Newton presently serves as a Vice President on the AFL–CIO Executive Council and as Chairman of the Materials Sector of IndustriALL, an international labor federation comprising 50 million workers in 140 countries. Since 2003, he has also served as Chairman of Brotherhood Bank & Trust. In 2008 he was unanimously chosen by the Brotherhood Bank and Trust Board of Directors to also serve as its Chief Executive Officer.

Transatlantic merger 
On February 8, 2020, Boilermakers announced was planning a strategic partnership with its the British and Irish trade union the Transport Salaried Staffs' Association to support rail workers on both sides of the Atlantic.  Later on September 21, 2021, TSSA announced it was planning a full merger with the Boilermakers.   This would make the first transatlantic merger of a major trade union. On February 4, 2022, TSSA union representatives backed the merger by 88%.  On February 8, 2022, TSSA balloted it members about the merger, advocating a Yes vote to the motion. On March 2, 2022, 85% of members backed the merger and TSSA says it planning to complete the merger by the summer.

Leadership

Presidents
1893: Lee Johnson
1897: John McNeil
1905: George F. Dunn
1908: Joseph A. Franklin
1944: Charles MacGowan
1954: William Calvin
1962: Russell K. Berg
1970: Harold J. Buoy
1983: Charles W. Jones
2003: Newton B. Jones

Secretary-Treasurers
1893: William J. Gilthorpe
1914: Frank Reinmeyer
1920: Joseph Flynn
1926: Charles F. Scott
1936: William E. Walter
1945: William J. Buckley
1958: Homer E. Patton
1973: Charles F. Moran
1986: Don Whan
1989: Jerry Willburn
2005: William T. Creeden

References

External links

Archives
 International Brotherhood of Boilermakers, Iron Shipbuilders, Blacksmiths, Forgers, and Helpers of America, Local 104 (Seattle, Washington) Records, 1937–1961. 7 cubic feet.
 Joseph Clancy Papers. 1921–1972. 1.5 linear feet, includes oversize. Contains records from Clancy's service as a secretary of the  International Brotherhood of Boilermakers and Blacksmiths, Local 104, in Seattle, Washington from 1941–1958. 
 A.F. O'Neill Papers. 1942–1947. 2 linear feet. Contains records from O'Neill's service as business manager of International Brotherhood of Boilermakers, Iron Shipbuilders, Blacksmiths, Forgers, and Helpers, Local 104, Seattle from 1942–1947. 
 Walter H. Rasmussen. 1946–1967. 5" linear. Contains records from Rasmussen's service as an officer of the International Brotherhood of Boilermakers and Blacksmiths, Local 104 in Seattle from 1946–1967. 
 Evan M. Weston Papers. 1919–1970. 3.22 cubic feet, 2 sound cassettes, 3 phonodiscs: 78 rpm. 

Trade unions established in 1893
AFL–CIO
Building and construction trade unions
Canadian Labour Congress
International Metalworkers' Federation
Trade unions in Canada
Metal trade unions
Boilermakers